This is a list of the results of the 1962 general election to the Legislative Assembly of Bihar, a state in India, including a list of successful candidates. After the elections, the Congress emerged as the largest party, and Pandit Binodanand Jha was sworn in as the Chief Minister of Bihar. Satyendra Narayan Sinha was designated as his second-in-command with the educational portfolio.

General statistics

Results

List of successful candidates

References

External links 
 

Bihar
1962
1962